Grey wolf (Old Turkic: Böri) is a sacred animal and national symbol in Turkic mythology.

Significance of grey wolves 
The wolf Asena is part of the origin story of all Turkic and Mongolian tribes. The Göktürks have a wolf on their blue flag. It represents war, the spirit of war, freedom, speed, nature. According to their beliefs, when something happens to the Turkish nation, when a threat arises, the Wolf appears and guides them. They placed golden poles with wolf heads on top in front of their tents to protect them. Their warrior spirits took on the appearances of wolves. A sixth-century Turkic stone monument depicts a boy suckling milk from a wolf. In Turkic folk culture, it is believed that carrying a wolf tooth in your pocket will protect you from the evil eye. In the Yakut documents their guardian wolf is referred to as Bosko. For Kyrgyz people, seeing a wolf while walking in the steppe was seen as a sign of good luck and safety. Seeing a wolf in a dream was also a good sign. They used to put wolf teeth or skin under their pillows to protect the pregnant woman from the evil eye. Diving into a flock of sheep or entering a barn was considered a favor to the wolf. According to Bashkir mythology, a wolf fell in front of the ancient Bashkirs and showed them the way. Therefore, they were called Bashkirs, which means "with a wolf on their heads."

See also
 Asena
 Romulus and Remus
 Wolf salute

References

National symbols of Turkey
Ashina house of the Turkic Empire
Turkic mythology
Mongol mythology
Göktürks
Wolves in folklore, religion and mythology
Nationalist symbols